Maghi is the regional name of the Hindu festival of Makar Sankranti celebrated in Punjab, Haryana Jammu division and Himachal Pradesh. In Himachal, the festival is also known as Maghi Saaji or Magha Ra Saza. In Bihar and Nepal it is also referred to as Maghi Parva or Maghi Sankranti. whereas it is known as Maghi Sangrand or Uttarain (Uttarayana) in Jammu and Sakrat in Haryana, Maghi is celebrated on first day of  the month of Magh of  Hindu Calendar. It follows on the heels of the mid-winter festival of Lohri which is marked by bonfires in North Indian fields and yards. The next morning Hindus see as an auspicious occasion for ritual bathing in ponds and rivers.

In Hinduism
Makar Sankranti (or Pongal) is celebrated in other parts of Indian subcontinent by Hindus, and is always on the first day of the month of Magha in Bikrami calendar. On Maghi, when the sun takes its northern journey on entering the sign of Makara or Capricorn, the Hindus take bath in the Ganges or if that is not possible, in some other river, rivulet, canal or pond. It follows the festival of Lohri in north India, particularly popular in the Punjab region.

Himachal Pradesh
Maghi is popularly referred to as Magha Ra Saza in some parts of Himachal Pradesh. As Magh is the coldest month in the hills when agriculture comes to stand still, this month is dedicated to worship of Agni Devta. In villages of Himachal, Lohri night is part of Maghi celebrations and is referred to as Masant. Another ritual associated with Maghi is Madraison Puja when the houses are cleaned and decorated.

In Sikhism

For Sikhs it is a community gathering to commemorate martyrdom of forty Sikhs (Chalis Mukte) who once had deserted the tenth and last human Guru of Sikhism, Guru Gobind Singh at Anandpur Sahib, but later rejoined the Guru and died while fighting the Mughal Empire army led by Wazir Khan in 1705. Sikhs make a pilgrimage to the site of the war, and take a dip in the sacred water tanks of Muktsar.

A fair (mela) is held at Muktsar Sahib every year and called the Mela Maghi is held  in memory of the forty Sikh martyrs. Before this tradition started to commemorate the Sikh martyrs who gave their lives to protect the tenth Guru, the festival was observed and mentioned by Guru Amar Das, the third Guru of Sikhism.

Cultural celebration
In Punjab, Maghi is celebrated by people eating kheer such as Rauh di kheer which is an old dish where rice is cooked in sugarcane juice. The dish is prepared in the evening before Maghi and is kept to cool. It is served cold next morning on Maghi with red-chili mixed curd. In some parts of Punjab, India, it is also traditional practice to eat Khichdi mixed with lentils, consume raw sugarcane and jaggery, Fairs are held at many places in Punjab  on Maghi.

See also 
 Makar Sankranti
 Sankranti
Thai Pongal
 Winter Solstice
 Lohri
 Maghe Sankranti

References

Religious festivals in India
Hindu festivals
Folk festivals in India
Sikh festivals
Festivals
 
Harvest festivals
Winter festivals